Shi Xiangsheng (born 1942) is a Chinese writer. He is best known for his 1997 story "A Sun in the Sky", which was adapted into Zhang Yimou's 1999 film Not One Less.

During the Cultural Revolution, Shi was sent to Xinjiang province in western China to work as a peasant, after which he became a teacher and a writer. His other works include The Divorce and The Birthday Present.

References

External links

1942 births
People's Republic of China writers
Living people
Chinese fiction writers